Ho-oh may refer to:

Fenghuang, mythological birds in East Asia
Ho-Oh, a legendary Pokémon resembling the fenghuang

See also
 Hoo (disambiguation)
 Hydrogen peroxide, chemical formula HOOH